The 2010 World Rally Championship was the 38th season of the FIA World Rally Championship. The season consisted of 13 rallies, beginning with Rally Sweden on 11 February and ended with Wales Rally GB on 14 November.

France's Sébastien Loeb won the drivers championship, his seventh consecutive title, after winning his home rally on 3 October and Citroën secured their sixth Manufacturers' title. In the junior classes held alongside the main championship, Aaron Burkart won the JWRC Drivers' championship, Xavier Pons won the SWRC Drivers' championship, Red Bull Rally Team won the WRC Cup and Armindo Araújo retained his PWRC Drivers' championship title.

2010 was the final season that the 2.0 litre engine package–which débuted in the 1997 World Rally Championship–was used. It was also the final season that Pirelli was the sole tyre supplier for the championship; as DMACK and Michelin became the tyre suppliers and a new 1.6 litre engine package was introduced for the 2011 season.

Changes

 Event organisers are given more flexibility. Rallies can be run over two, three or four days, but must finish on a Saturday or Sunday. Mixing asphalt and gravel surfaces is allowed, either within a stage or within the itinerary of a day. There will no longer be a minimum or maximum distance for a special stage. The total stage distance of the event has been changed to 300–500 kilometres. Night stages are permitted but should not form the whole itinerary of a day.
 There will be a new Super 2000 World Rally Championship (SWRC) class for drivers with Super 2000 cars, and within it there will be a WRC Cup for teams. Teams need to contest at least seven rounds, including at least one outside Europe.
 The WRC will also introduce a ranking system called the Drivers' World Rally Ranking system in 2010, similar to that in golf or tennis.
 A new points system has been introduced to all classes for the 2010 season, so that more finishers in a rally are awarded points. Previously points had been awarded to the top eight finishers:

It is the first time since 1997 that ten drivers will score points on a rally.

 From June, the name of the co-driver will be included on the rear side windows of competition cars.

Calendar

The 2010 championship was contested over thirteen rounds in Europe, North America, the Middle East, South America, Asia and Oceania.

The 2010 season included thirteen rallies, which was one more than 2009. Australia, Argentina, Cyprus, Ireland, Norway, Poland, Italy and Greece were dropped from the calendar for the 2010 season, while Sweden, Mexico, Jordan, Turkey, Germany, New Zealand, France and Japan returned. Bulgaria was part of the calendar for the first time.

The nine events also part of the Production World Rally Championship were Sweden, Mexico, Jordan, New Zealand, Finland, Germany, Japan, France and Great Britain. The six rallies also on the Junior World Rally Championship were Turkey, Portugal, Bulgaria, Germany, France and Spain. The ten rallies on the new Super 2000 World Rally Championship (for S2000 driver) and WRC Cup (for S2000 teams) were Sweden, Mexico, Jordan, New Zealand, Portugal, Finland, Germany, Japan, France and Great Britain.

The finalised calendar was published by the FIA on 11 December 2009, following earlier proposed calendars issued in September and October 2009.

Teams and drivers
In 2010 two categories were eligible to compete for the Manufacturer's championship:

Manufacturer
must take part in all the rallies of the Championship with two cars of the same make
must enter only cars corresponding to the 2009 homologated version of a World Rally Car in conformity with the 2010 Appendix J
must inform the FIA of the name of the first driver entered for the season at the time of registration for the Championship. The driver may change only after the agreement of the WRC Commission. The driver of the second car may be changed for each of the rallies in the Championship

WRC Team
must take part in a minimum of 8 rallies, including two outside Europe, with one or two cars; those rallies must be nominated on registering for the Championship
cannot enter World Rally Cars homologated during the year 2009 and cannot use parts homologated after 2 January 2010
can only score points in the events it nominated on registering.

The registered Manufacturers were Citroën Total World Rally Team and BP Ford Abu Dhabi World Rally Team; the registered WRC Teams were Stobart M-Sport Ford, Munchi's Ford and the Citroën Junior Team.

 – indicates a car running with varying numbers during the season

Driver changes

 Kimi Raikkonen joined Citroen Junior Team fulltime after leaving Scuderia Ferrari Formula One and making his WRC debut during 2009 Rally Finland.
 Evgeniy Novikov and Conrad Rautenbach both left Citroen Junior Team.
 Ken Block joined the series with Monster World Rally Team to contest selected rounds of the season.

J-WRC entries

S-WRC entries

P-WRC entries

† – At each rally, the organiser may nominate two "guest drivers" from their country to score support category points.

Results and standings

Results

Standings

Drivers' championship

Manufacturers' championship

JWRC Drivers' championship

Notes
† Egoi Eder Valdes Lopez has been removed from the Classification.

SWRC Drivers' championship

Notes
† Andersson's entrant RUFA Sport failed to compete in the required number of events, meaning all of Andersson's points scored with the team have been annulled. His win in Sweden remains as he competed as a wildcard entrant and not with RUFA.

‡ Tuohino has not completed the season due to a lack of budget, which resulted in the FIA excluding him from the championship.

WRC Cup for Super 2000 Teams championship

PWRC Drivers' championship

Notes
† Miguel Baldoni has been removed from the Classification.

References

External links

 Official website of the World Rally Championship
 FIA World Rally Championship 2010 at ewrc-results.com

2010
2010 in motorsport